James Patrick Major (May 14, 1836 – May 8, 1877) was a career U.S. Army officer and a Confederate brigadier general during the American Civil War.

US Cavalry service
Major graduated 23rd in his class at the United States Military Academy and became a second lieutenant in the United States Cavalry in July 1856. He served on the Texas frontier and participated in the Battle of Wichita Village against the Comanche in 1858.

Confederate States Army
Major resigned from the U. S. Army on March 21, 1861, and joined the Missouri State Guard as a lieutenant colonel. He fought in the Battle of Wilson's Creek on August 10, 1861. He was an acting commander in Earl Van Dorn's artillery during the Siege of Vicksburg. He was transferred to the trans-Mississippi theater and promoted to brigadier general in July 1863 and commanded a cavalry division in the Red River Campaign.

In 1864, he fought at both Mansfield and Pleasant Hill in De Soto Parish and with General Hamilton P. Bee at Monett's Ferry in Natchitoches Parish, Louisiana.

Post war
After the war, Major went to France and then returned to Louisiana and later to Texas where he died on May 8, 1877. He is buried in Donaldsonville, Ascension Parish, Louisiana in an ornate tomb in the Ascension of our Lord Catholic Church Cemetery.

See also

List of American Civil War generals (Confederate)

Notes

References
 Eicher, John H., and David J. Eicher, Civil War High Commands. Stanford: Stanford University Press, 2001. .
 Sifakis, Stewart. Who Was Who in the Civil War. New York: Facts On File, 1988. .
 Warner, Ezra J. Generals in Gray: Lives of the Confederate Commanders. Baton Rouge: Louisiana State University Press, 1959. .
  Winters, John D. The Civil War in Louisiana. Baton Rouge: Louisiana State University Press, 1963. .

External links

Confederate States Army brigadier generals
People of Missouri in the American Civil War
United States Army officers
1836 births
1877 deaths
United States Military Academy alumni
People from Fayette, Missouri
Burials at Ascension of our Lord Catholic Church Cemetery (Donaldsonville)